Justin Benson may refer to:
 Justin Benson (cricketer) (born 1967), former Irish cricketer
 Justin Benson (filmmaker) (born 1983), American filmmaker